The Liberian Football Association Cup, commonly known as the LFA Cup and currently known as the PetroTrade Cup due to sponsorship reasons, is an annual knockout cup competition in Liberian football. The LFA Cup is run by and named after the Liberia Football Association and usually refers to the Liberian men's tournament, although a LFA Women's Cup is also held.

The LFA Cup was first held in 1974 with Mighty Barrolle being crowned the first champions. Entry is open to all teams who compete in the Liberian First and Second Divisions. The reigning champions is LISCR FC, who defeated Tony FC in the 2022 final.

Format
The competition is a knockout tournament with pairings for each round drawn at random. There are no seeds and the draw for each round is not made until after the scheduled dates for the previous round. The draw also determines which teams will play at home. Each tie is played as a single leg. If a match is drawn, there is a 30-minute overtime, and  penalty shoot-outs if needed.

Draw
The draw for each of the rounds is unseeded and is held at the LFA Headquarters.

Eligible teams
All clubs in the Liberian Premier League and Second Division League are automatically eligible.

African qualification

The LFA Cup winners qualify for the following season's CAF Confederation Cup. This African place applies even if the team is relegated or is not in the Liberian top flight. However, if the LFA Cup winning team has also qualified for the following season's Champions League, then the losing LFA Cup finalist is given the Confederation Cup place instead. LFA Cup winners enter the Confederation Cup at the Qualifiers Stage.

The LFA Cup winners also qualify for the single-match LFA Super Cup against the Liberian Premier League Champions.

Venues
Matches in the LFA Cup are usually played at the home ground of one of the two teams. The team who plays at home is decided when the matches are drawn. There is no seeding system in place within rounds other than when teams enter the competition, therefore the home team is simply the first team drawn out for each fixture. Occasionally games may have to be moved to other grounds due to other events taking place, security reasons or a ground not being suitable to host popular teams.

The LFA Cup Final is usually held at the Antoinette Tubman Stadium

Sponsorship
The LFA Cup doesn't have sponsors at this moment.

LFA Cup winners
Five clubs have won consecutive LFA Cups on more than one occasion: Cedar United (1976, 1977), Mighty Barrolle (1983, 1984, 1985, 1986), LPRC Oilers (1988, 1989 and 1999, 2000), Invincible Eleven (1997, 1998)and LISCR FC (2003, 2004).

Seven clubs have won the LFA Cup as part of a League and Cup double, namely Mighty Barrolle (1974, 1986, 1995), Invincible Eleven (1987, 1997, 1998), NPA Anchors (1994), Junior Professionals (1996), LPRCOilers (1999, 2005), Monrovia Black Stars (2008) and Barrack Young Controllers (2013). Mighty Barrolle and Invincible Eleven share the record of three doubles. Mighty Barrolle have won a double in each of three separate decades (1970s, 1980s, 1990s). Invincible Eleven's three doubles between 1987-1998 highlights their dominance of Liberian football at the time.

LFA Cup winners and finalists
1974 : Mighty Barrolle (Monrovia)
1975 : not played
1976 : Cedar United (Monrovia)
1977 : Cedar United (Monrovia)
1978 : Mighty Barrolle (Monrovia)
1979 : not played
1980 : not played
1981 : Mighty Barrolle (Monrovia)
1982 : Saint Joseph Warriors
1983 : Mighty Barrolle (Monrovia)
1984 : Mighty Barrolle (Monrovia)
1985 : Mighty Barrolle (Monrovia)
1986 : Mighty Barrolle (Monrovia)
1987 : Invincible Eleven (Monrovia)
1988 : LPRC Oilers (Monrovia)
1989 : LPRC Oilers (Monrovia)
1990 : not played
1991 : Invincible Eleven (Monrovia)
1992 : NPA Anchors (Monrovia) 3-1 Invincible Eleven
1993 : LPRC Oilers (Monrovia)
1994 : Monrovia Club Breweries (Monrovia)
1995 : Mighty Barrolle (Monrovia)
1996 : Junior Professional (Monrovia)
1997 : Invincible Eleven (Monrovia)
1998 : Invincible Eleven (Monrovia)  1-2 1-0 Junior Professional
1999 : LPRC Oilers (Monrovia)
2000 : LPRC Oilers (Monrovia)
2001 : not known
2002 : Mighty Blue Angels (Unific. Town) bt Mark Professionals
2003 : LISCR FC
2004 : LISCR FC  2-0 Bassa Defender 
2005 : LPRC Oilers (Monrovia)
2006 : NPA Anchors (Monrovia) 2-2 Mighty Barrolle (Monrovia) (aet, 3-2 pen) 
2007 : Saint Joseph Warriors bt  LISCR FC
2008 : Monrovia Black Star (Monrovia) 4-1 Mighty Barrolle
2009 : Barrack Young Controllers 1-0 LPRC Oilers (Monrovia) 
2010 : Aries 4-3 Monrovia Black Star
2011 : Invincible Eleven 1-0 Barrack Young Controllers
2012 : Barrack Young Controllers II (reserve side) 1-0 Watanga FC
2013 : Barrack Young Controllers 6-0 Fatu FC
2013/14 : FC Fassell 1-0 NPA Anchors (Monrovia) 
2015 : Barrack Young Controllers II (reserve side) 0-0 (aet), 3-2 (p) Monrovia Club Breweries
2016 : Monrovia Breweries 2-0 (awarded) Mighty Barrolle (Monrovia)
2017 : LISCR FC 3-0 ELWA United
2018 : Barrack Young Controllers 4-0 LISCR FC
2019 : LISCR FC 2-0 Barrack Young Controllers
2020 : Abandoned
2021 : Monrovia Club Breweries 2-1 Watanga FC
2022 : LISCR FC 2-2 (aet), 4-2 (p) Tony FC

See also
Liberia national football team

References

External links
Liberia – List of Cup Winners at RSSSF
Liberiansoccer.com – "the official home of Liberian football" – "FIFA approved" – current official standings provided (archived)

Football competitions in Liberia
National association football cups